John Fell may refer to:

John Fell (bishop) (1625–1686), Bishop of Oxford
John Fell (tutor) (1735–1797), English congregationalist minister and classical tutor
John Fell (judge) (1721–1798), American farmer and jurist
John Barraclough Fell (1815–1902), British railway engineer
John Fell (Canadian politician) (1819–1901), Ontario businessman, farmer and political figure
John Fell (industrialist), Scottish-Australian pioneer of the Australian oil shale and oil refining industries
John Fell (drummer) (born 1961), American drummer